A  (French) is a cool, well-ventilated area where cold dishes (such as salads, appetizers, canapés, pâtés, and terrines) are prepared and other foods are stored under refrigeration. The person in charge of this area is known as the "" or "pantry chef". Larger hotels and restaurants may have  staff to perform additional duties, such as creating decorative elements of buffet presentation like ice carving and edible centerpieces.

History

The term  originated in pre-Revolutionary France, where large, wealthy households designated a kitchen manager to supervise the use and storage of large amounts of foodstuffs.  The term  literally means 'keeping to eat'.

The term  is also related to the cold rooms inside castles and manor houses where the food was stored. These food storage areas were usually located in the lower levels, since the cool basement-like environment was ideal for storing food. These cold storage areas developed over time into the modern cold kitchen.

Most merchants who worked outside noble manors at this time were associated with a guild, an association of persons of the same trade formed for their mutual aid and protection. Guilds would develop training programs for their members, thereby preserving their knowledge and skills.  was the name of a guild that prepared and sold cooked items made from pigs. Through this organization, the methods of preparing hams, bacon, sausages, pâtés, and terrines were preserved.

The position of "butcher" first developed as a specialty within the garde manger kitchen. As both the cost of and demand for animal meats increased, more space was required for the task of fabricating and portioning the raw meats. This increased need for space was due not only to an upswing in the volume of meat sales, but also to the need for separating raw meats from processed foods to avoid cross-contamination and the resulting possibility of foodborne illness.

Modern 
Modern  can refer to different things in the professional kitchen. In many restaurants, it is a station which is generally an entry-level cooking position within a restaurant, as it often involves preparing salads or other smaller plates which can be heated and quickly plated without significant experience. In other high-profile classically influenced restaurants and hotels, the position pertains to the classical preparations, which often include pâtés, terrines and elaborate aspics.

See also

 Brigade de cuisine
 Garnish (food)
 Food presentation
 List of restaurant terminology
 Pantry

References

 Food production operation and management : Aman Publisher India 
 Culinary Institute of America. Garde Manger: The Art and Craft of the Cold Kitchen

External links

Gardemanger.com web archive
Wiktionary: garde-manger

 
Cooking
Food services occupations
Food storage